Countess of Southampton is a title that may belong to either the wife of the Earl of Southampton or a countess in her own right. The title may refer to:

Mary Wriothesley, Countess of Southampton (1552–1607), wife of Henry Wriothesley, 2nd Earl of Southampton
Elizabeth Wriothesley, Countess of Southampton (1572–1655), wife of Henry Wriothesley, 3rd Earl of Southampton
Barbara Palmer, 1st Duchess of Cleveland (1640–1709), countess in her own right